June A. Carryl (born June 10, 1967) is an American actress and playwright who has made numerous television appearances such as Mindhunter.

Biography
June Carryl was raised in Denver by her single mother alongside two younger siblings. Her mother died at the age of fifty-three of breast cancer. Carryl received her Bachelor's Degree in political science and planned on being a lawyer, but transitioned to English Literature in graduate school, observing that, "every one of my classmates who went to law school came back miserable and I never managed to force myself to do internships and the stuff you're supposed to do." She studied playwriting though her first play was less than a success. Despite this, she found that she enjoyed writing and she went on to receive the AADA Award Saroyan/Paul Award for Plays About Human Rights in 2017 with her play THE GOOD MINISTER FROM HARARE. Eventually, she took a teacher's suggestion pursue acting after being drafted into the class soap opera.

Career
Carryl, sometimes credited as June Lomena,' has appeared in film and television, largely in character roles. She has appeared in films such as What Dreams May Come, Sweet November, Back Roads. She made numerous one off appearances on television such as Parenthood, Law & Order: LA, Criminal Minds, The Bold and the Beautiful and Without a Trace

She landed a major recurring role on the Netflix series Mindhunter. On the production of the show she stated "It was so challenging! It was Awesome...It was a whole production so trained on the goal of telling this story right—like every detail." Carryl joined the cast of Helstrom as Louise Hastings..

Filmography

Film

Television

References

External links

Living people
1976 births
African-American actresses
Actresses from Iowa
American television actresses
21st-century African-American people
20th-century African-American people
20th-century African-American women
21st-century African-American women